The Beta Phi Mu Award is an annual prize recognizing an individual for distinguished service to education for librarianship. First bestowed in 1954, Award recipients include various prominent leaders in the field of librarianship. The Award is sponsored by the international honor society Beta Phi Mu (ΒΦΜ or βφμ), founded in 1948 to promote scholastic achievement among library and information science students.

Recipients

2020-present
2021. Marcia Rapchak. School of Computing and Information, University of Pittsburgh. 
2020. John M. Budd. University of Missouri.

2010-2019

2019. Mirah J. Dow. Emporia State University.
2018. Clara Chu, University of Illinois Library at Urbana-Champaign 
2017. Em Claire Knowles, Simmons College, School of Library and Information Science 
2016. Annabel K.Stephens, University of Southern Mississippi
2015. Beverly P. Lynch, University of California, Los Angeles
2014. Beth M. Paskoff, Louisiana State University.
2013. Elizabeth Aversa, University of Alabama
2012. Mary Wagner, St. Catherine University in St. Paul, Minn.
2011. Lesley S.J. Farmer, California State University Long Beach
2010. Ken Haycock, San Jose State University

2000-2009

2009. C. James Schmidt, San Jose State University, CA.
2008. Ching-chih Chen, Simmons College, Boston 
2007. Barbara Immroth, University of Texas-Austin 
2006. Lois Mai Chan, University of Kentucky 
2005. Lynn Akin, Texas Woman's University
2004. Linda C. Smith, University of Illinois 
2003. Kathleen de la Peña McCook, Louisiana State University, University of South Florida.
2002. Leigh Stewart Estabrook,  University of Illinois
2001. Lotsee Patterson,  University of Oklahoma 
2000. Shirley Fitzgibbons, Indiana University

1990-1999

1999. D. W. Krummel, University of Illinois 
1998. Elizabeth W. Stone, Catholic University
1997. Charles Bunge, University of Wisconsin
1996. Robert N. Broadus, Northern Illinois University
1995. Elizabeth Futas, University of Rhode Island
1994. Jane B. Robbins, University of Wisconsin-Madison
1993. Kathryn Luther Henderson, University of Illinois
1992. Guy Garrison, Drexel University
1991. Edward G. Holley, University of North Carolina 
1990. Robert D. Stueart, Simmons College, Boston

1980-1989

1989. Charles D. Patterson, Louisiana State University
1988. Samuel Rothstein, University of British Columbia  (first Canadian to hold Ph.D. in Librarianship)
1987. Sarah K. Vann, University of Hawaii
1986. Agnes Lytton Reagan, ALA Accreditation Officer
1985. Robert M. Hayes, University of California Los Angeles
1984. Jane Anne Hannigan, Columbia University, Rutgers University
1983. J. Periam Danton, University of California, Berkeley
1982. David K. Berninghausen, University of Minnesota
1981. Haynes McMullen, University of North Carolina at Chapel
1980. Virginia Lacy Jones, Atlanta University

1970-1979

1979. Conrad Rawski, Case Western Reserve. University
1978. Frances E. Henne, Columbia University
1977. Russell E. Bidlack, University of Michigan
1976. Carolyn Whitenack, Purdue University
1975. Kenneth R. Shaffer, Simmons College
1974. Martha Boaz, University of Southern California
1973. Lester Asheim, University of Chicago, University of North Carolina
1972. Margaret E. Monroe, University of Wisconsin-Madison
1971. Leon Carnovsky University of Chicago
1970. Raynard C. Swank, University of California Berkeley

1969-1969

1969. Ethel M. Fair
1968. Sarah R. Reed
1967. Louis Shores, Florida State University
1966. James J. Kortendick
1965. Jesse H. Shera, University of Chicago, Case Western Reserve University
1964. Charles C. Williamson, Columbia University
1963 Ernest J. Reece
1962 Florrinell F. Morton, Louisiana State University
1961. Robert L. Gitler
1960. Louis Round Wilson, University of Chicago, University of North Carolina

1954-1959

1959.Anita Miller Hostetter
1958. Florence Van Hoesen
1957. Lucy M. Crissey
1956. Margaret I Rufsvold
1955. Gretchen Knief Schenk
1954. Rudolph Hjalmar Gjelsness, University of Michigan

References

Library-related organizations
Library science awards
Awards established in 1954
Honor societies